Simon Rae is a British poet, broadcaster, biographer and playwright who runs the Top Edge Productions theatre company. He won the Poetry Society's National Poetry Competition in 1999 and has also been awarded an Eric Gregory Award and a Southern Arts Literature Bursary and held Royal Literary Fund fellowships at Oxford Brookes and Warwick Universities. His play Grass won a Fringe Highlight award in 2002.

Rae presented Radio 4's Poetry Please for five years and wrote a regular topical poem for the Saturday Guardian for ten years. His most recent book of poems was Gift Horses, published in 2006 by Enitharmon Press.

He has written a biography of the cricketer WG Grace: W.G.Grace: A Life (Faber, 1998).

Sources
Simon Rae, poet, broadcaster, biographer, playwright website
Royal Literary Fund -Simon Rae website
Simon Rae - Playwright website
Top Edge Productions website
Enitharmon Press website
Radio 4 - Poetry Please website

Living people
British dramatists and playwrights
Cricket historians and writers
Year of birth missing (living people)
British male dramatists and playwrights